All Saints is an inner city area of Wolverhampton, West Midlands, England. It is situated immediately to the south-east of the city centre, in the city council's Ettingshall ward.

It mostly consists of late 19th century and early 20th century terraced houses, which are mainly inhabited by Sikh and Ravidassia immigrants from the Indian sub-continent. Modern landmarks in the area include The Workspace, an office facility on the site of the former All Saints Primary School, Ford and Nissan car dealerships, a bowling alley and a Fitness First public gym. The Royal Hospital, Wolverhampton, which closed in June 1997, is situated in the area.

It is a fairly deprived area with high levels of crime and unemployment, with much of the housing stock in a dismal condition. As recently as the 1980s, many houses in the area were lacking bathrooms and indoor toilets. Since then, a significant number of these older properties have been demolished.

All Saints is served by All Saints Action Network, a social enterprise which has been operating in the area since 1997 and seeks to make All Saints a better place to live and work

References

Areas of Wolverhampton